Witch Story is a 1989 Italian horror film directed by Alessandro Capone.

Synopsis
The film is set in rural Florida. After passing on her diabolical legacy to a child, a witch is burned alive by the local population, even as the priest had hoped to exorcise her. Fifty years later, several teens gather in the house where the witch once lived. One of the teens inherited after his father's mysterious death. After some of the kids experience visions of a little girl, one reveals her interest in the occult. Later, vacationers experience increasingly disturbing events. When some girls are possessed by the witch and begin to decimate their companions, the survivors manage to contact a priest for help.

Production
Witch Story was the directorial debut of Alessandro Capone. Capone had previously worked as a screenwriter since the mid-1970s including a few horror films such as Body Count. Capone stated that he was a fan of horror films and wanted his debut to be a horror film. He had the international distributor Manolo Bolognini to give him a new guaranteed minimum to help start the project. The film was shot partially in Rome but predominantly in Florida.

Release
Witch Story was distributed in Italy by Titanus on 26 May 1989. The film was released in the United Kingdom as Witch Story, in other English territories as Superstion 2 due its similarities to the film Superstition. In Germany the film was released as a sequel to Larry Cohen's Wicked Stepmother which was titled Tanz der Hexen with Witch Story being titled Tanz der Hexen Teil 2.

Reception
In Italy, Leonardo Autera of Corriere della Sera gave the film a negative review noting "slapdash editing, full of inconsistencies", "coarse special effects" and an "amateur cast" outside Ian Bannen whom the reviewer noted looked bored in the film.

See also
 List of Italian films of 1989
 List of horror films of 1989

Footnotes

Sources

External links
 

Films set in Florida
Films set in 1927
1989 horror films
1989 films
Italian horror films
Films shot in Florida
Films about witchcraft
Films shot in Rome
1989 directorial debut films
Films directed by Alessandro Capone
Films scored by Carlo Maria Cordio
1980s Italian films